The 1998 East Java ninja scare was an outbreak of mass hysteria in East Java, Indonesia, in which the local population believed they were being targeted by sorcerers known as ninja, who were blamed for mysterious killings of religious leaders by assassins dressed in black. As many as 150-300 “sorcerers” were killed between February and October, with the most deaths occurring between August and September.

Background

According to Jason Brown, Banyuwangi is a centre of black magic in Indonesia. Black magic practiced in Banyuwangi is a mix of animist beliefs and Islamic mysticism which developed from inter-religious conflict during the 16th century Mataram court period. Belief in black magic, or dukun santet, is widespread in the area.

Events

The killings began in Banyuwangi Regency in February. Organized assassins, dressed in black from which they gained the name ninja, began attacking leaders affiliated with Nahdlatul Ulama. Local people began to hunt down and kill anyone who they believed to be ‘ninjas’ in response. About five people were killed between February and July. In the month of August, 40 people were killed, and in September the number rose to 80.

On 18 October 1998, five men were killed in the Turen area. One was beaten to death, one was burned and three were beheaded. On 20 October 1998, three killings occurred. Two had been seized from a police car by vigilantes who reportedly slit their throats, and the third was the man whose head was paraded on a stake.

On 24 October at Gondanglegi, Malang Regency, another five suspected ninjas were killed by villagers. One victim was burnt to death while another one was beheaded.

Local press reports

On 1 October 1998, the Surabaya Post reported  “a rumour about the existence of attacks by ninja-like squads” that were targeting “community leaders as well as ulama. As a result, the residents near Islamic boarding schools undertake tight guards around the houses of ulamas who have become targets.” On 4 October 1998, the Jawa Pos  reported that “prayer teachers are in the sights of groups of dozens of killers who wear all-black clothes and masks like ninjas.”

Casualties

A Nahdlatul Ulama investigation team found that 143 ‘ninja’ were killed in Banyuwangi and 105 in other regions of East Java such as Jember, Sumenep and Pasuruan, making the total documented death toll 248, though it may be higher.

Theories

There have been a number of theories regarding who was behind the original organised killing of the Nahdlatul Ulama religious leaders. Abdurrahman Wahid, then head of Nahdlatul Ulama, claimed they were ordered by elite politicians.

References

1998 in Indonesia
History of East Java
Religiously motivated violence in Indonesia
Scares
Ninja
Banyuwangi (town)
Asian shamanism
Crimes involving Satanism or the occult
Mass psychogenic illness
Moral panic